The 2015 Atlantic 10 women's basketball tournament was played March 4–8 at the Richmond Coliseum in Richmond, Virginia. This will be a 14 team Tournament with the addition of Davidson. The top 10 seeds received a first round bye and the top 4 seeds received a double bye. The 2015 tournament champion received an automatic bid to the 2015 NCAA tournament.

Seeds
Teams are seeded by record within the conference, with a tiebreaker system to seed teams with identical conference records.

Schedule

*Game times in Eastern Time. #Rankings denote tournament seeding.

Bracket

References

See also
2015 Atlantic 10 men's basketball tournament

2014–15 NCAA Division I women's basketball season
2015